Arizona's 9th congressional district was created as a result of the 2010 Census. The first candidates ran in the 2012 House elections, and the first representative was seated for the 113th Congress in 2013. Formerly located in the Phoenix area, the 9th district has been in western Arizona since 2023.

Paul Gosar, who previously represented the 1st and 4th districts, was elected to the seat in 2022 following redistricting. He was sworn in on January 3, 2023.

Historical boundaries 
Because it was created in the 2010 redistricting cycle, the first iteration of the 9th district was in effect for election cycles from 2012 to 2020. This version of the district was entirely within Maricopa County. The district included parts of the 2003–2013 versions of the 3rd, 4th, 5th, and 6th districts. Over 60% of the district's population came from the previous 5th district. During this period, the 9th district included liberal bastions such as Tempe, strongly conservative portions of the East Valley, and more moderate Republican voters in eastern and southern Phoenix.

Following the 2020 redistricting cycle, this district essentially became the 4th district, while the 9th was redrawn to cover most of the old 4th district. The 9th district's current boundaries include parts of La Paz, Mohave, Yuma, and Maricopa counties, taking up much of Arizona's western border. This district, like its predecessor, is heavily Republican. The 4th's incumbent, Paul Gosar, transferred to the 9th and was re-elected unopposed.

Election results in statewide races

2013–2023 boundaries

List of members representing the district 
Arizona began sending a ninth member to the House after the 2010 Census, the 2012 Congressional election, and the convening of the 113th Congress.

Complete election results

2012

2014

2016

2018

2020

2022

References

Notes

External links
 Maps of Congressional Districts first in effect for the 2002 election
 Final Congressional Maps for the 2012 election
 

09
Government of Maricopa County, Arizona
Chandler, Arizona
Mesa, Arizona
Phoenix, Arizona
Scottsdale, Arizona
Tempe, Arizona
Constituencies established in 2013
2013 establishments in Arizona